Rasheed Ahmad Siddiqui (1892–1977) was a noted Urdu writer and a professor at Aligarh Muslim University in India.

Literary life and style
Rasheed Ahmad Siddiqui was born in 1892 in Mariyahu, Jaunpur in Uttar Pradesh. He was one of the most distinguished Urdu writers of the 20th century, known for his unique style of expressing himself in speech as well as in his writings. He was not only a satirist and a humorist, but also a critic, a biographer, a writer of life-sketches and an accomplished essayist.

Noted for his mild satire and humour, impressionistic criticism, a lively style of expression and an eye and feeling for the right word, he has few equals in Urdu literature. He has been called a visionary with a solution in academic circles. Two short extracts from an article published on 13 October 2002 in Dawn Pakistan's leading English-language daily newspaper, reflect the consensus view on Siddiqui in the academic world:

Aligarh

Any study of his writings without keeping in mind the scholarly, literary and cultural ambiance of Aligarh Muslim University and the city of Aligarh would make little sense. Most of the themes, events and characters in his works are, in one way or another, related to Aligarh but one also catches glimpses of Mariyahu, his place of birth. However, Aligarh is invariably the main source of his inspiration and creativity.

Sahitya Akademi Award
He received the 1971 Sahitya Akademi Urdu Award for his book "Ghalib ki Shakhsiyat aur Shairi".

Literary works
 Mazameen-e-Rasheed
 Khundaan
 Ashufta Bayaani meri.
 Ghalib ki shakhsiyat awr Shayri
 Ganj Haye Giran maaya

Death
Rasheed Ahmad Siddiqui died in 1977.

See also
 List of Sahitya Akademi Award winners for Urdu

References

External links
 Urdustan Radio
 Article on Urdu
 His biography
 Iqbaliyat Kay Sau Saal, from Iqbal Cyber Library

1894 births
1977 deaths
Urdu-language humorists
Urdu-language writers
Linguists of Urdu
Urdu critics
Aligarh Muslim University alumni
People from Aligarh
Recipients of the Sahitya Akademi Award in Urdu
Recipients of the Padma Shri in literature & education
Academic staff of Aligarh Muslim University